Tupac Shakur, an American rapper, was fatally shot on September 7, 1996, in a drive-by shooting in Las Vegas, Nevada. He was 25 years old. The shooting occurred at 11:15 p.m. (PDT), when the car carrying Shakur was stopped at a red light at East Flamingo Road and Koval Lane.

Shakur was struck by four .40 caliber rounds fired from a Glock: two in the chest, one in the arm, and one in the thigh. He died from his wounds six days later.

Prior events
Tupac Shakur attended the Bruce Seldon vs. Mike Tyson boxing match with Marion "Suge" Knight, the head of Death Row Records, at the MGM Grand in Las Vegas, Nevada. After leaving the match, one of  Knight's associates, Travon "Tray" Lane, a member of the M.O.B. Pirus gang based in Compton, California, spotted Orlando "Baby Lane" Anderson, from the rival Southside Crips gang, in the MGM Grand lobby.

Earlier that year, in May 1996, Anderson and a group of Southside Crips attempted to rob Lane in a Foot Locker store. Lane told Shakur, who in turn attacked Anderson in the lobby. Shakur asked Anderson if he was from the "South" (Southside Crips) and punched him in the face, knocking him to the ground. Shakur and Knight's entourage assisted in assaulting Anderson. The fight, which was captured on the MGM Grand's video surveillance, was broken up by hotel security.

After the brawl, Shakur returned to his hotel, the Luxor Las Vegas. He disclosed to girlfriend Kidada Jones his involvement in the Anderson fight, previously having promised to return to her after entering the MGM Grand and having her stay in a vehicle. Shakur left with Knight in a BMW sedan after changing clothes and went to Club 662, which was owned by Knight, to perform at a charity concert.

Shooting and aftermath
At 11:00–11:05 p.m. (PDT), Shakur and Knight were halted on Las Vegas Boulevard by officers from the Las Vegas Metropolitan Police Department Bike Patrol for playing the car stereo too loudly and not having license plates. The plates were found in the trunk of Knight's car. The party was released a few minutes later without being cited. At 11:10 p.m. (PDT), while they were stopped at a red light at the intersection of East Flamingo Road and Koval Lane in front of the Maxim Hotel, a vehicle occupied by two women pulled up on their left side. Shakur, who was talking through the window of his brand new 1996 BMW 750iL [E38] sedan, exchanged words with the two women, and invited them to go to Club 662.

At 11:15 p.m. (PDT), a white, four-door, late-model Cadillac pulled up to Knight's right side. The shooter, seated at the back of the Cadillac, rolled down the window and rapidly fired gunshots from a .40 S&W Glock 22 at Shakur's BMW. Shakur was hit four times  twice in the chest, once in the arm, once in the thigh. One of the bullets went into Shakur's right lung. Knight was hit in the head by fragmentation.

Bodyguard Frank Alexander stated that when he was about to ride along with Shakur in Knight's car, Shakur asked him to drive Jones's car instead, in case they needed additional vehicles from Club 662 back to their hotel. Alexander reported in his documentary, Before I Wake, that shortly after the assault, one of the convoy's cars followed the assailant but he never heard from the occupants. Yaki Kadafi was riding in the car behind Shakur with bodyguards at the time of the shooting and, along with members of the Death Row entourage, refused to cooperate with police.

Despite Knight's injuries, and his vehicle having a flat tire, he was able to drive Shakur and himself a mile from the site, to Las Vegas Boulevard and Harmon Avenue. They were again pulled over by the Bike Patrol, who alerted paramedics through radio. After arriving on the scene, police and paramedics took Knight and Shakur to the University Medical Center of Southern Nevada. They were pulled over just a short distance from the MGM Grand, where their evening had begun.

Gobi Rahimi, a Death Row music video director who visited Shakur at the hospital, later reported that he received news from a Death Row marketing employee that the shooters had called the record label and threatened Shakur. Gobi told Las Vegas police, but said they claimed to be understaffed. No attackers came to the hospital. Shakur said he was dying while being carried into the emergency room.

At the hospital, Shakur was heavily sedated, was placed on life support machines, and was ultimately put under a medically-induced coma after repeatedly trying to get out of bed. He was visited by Jones and regained consciousness when she played Don McLean's "Vincent" on the CD player next to his bed. According to Jones, Shakur moaned and his eyes were filled with "mucus and swollen." Jones told Shakur that she loved him.

Knight was released from the hospital the day following the shooting on September 8, but did not speak until September 11. He told officers he "heard something, but saw nothing" the night of the shooting. A spokesman for the officers said Knight's statement did nothing to help the investigation. Officers at the time of Shakur's hospitalization reported having no leads. Sgt. Kevin Manning said during the week that officers did not receive "a whole lot of cooperation" from Shakur's entourage.

Rahimi and members of Shakur's group Outlawz guarded Shakur while he stayed in the hospital due to their fear that whoever shot Shakur "was gonna come finish him off". Rahimi mentioned the possibility that Outlawz brought weapons with them. While in the critical care unit on the afternoon of Friday, September 13, 1996, Shakur died of respiratory failure that led to cardiac arrest after the removal of his right lung. Doctors attempted to revive him, but could not stop the hemorrhaging. His mother, Afeni, made the decision to cease medical treatment. He was pronounced dead at 4:03 p.m. (PDT).

In 2014, a police officer who claimed he witnessed Shakur's last moments said Shakur refused to state who shot him. When the officer asked Shakur if he saw the person or people who shot him, Shakur responded by saying, "Fuck you" to the officer as his last words. Paramedics and other officers present at the scene did not report hearing Shakur say those words, nor did Knight or Alexander, who were also present.

Investigative reports on the murder
One year after the shooting, Sgt. Kevin Manning, who headed the investigation, told Las Vegas Sun investigative reporter Cathy Scott that Shakur's murder "may never be solved". The case slowed early in the investigation, he said, as few new clues came in and witnesses clammed up. Manning stated the investigation was at a standstill. E.D.I. Mean, a collaborator of Shakur's and a member of Outlawz, said he was positive law enforcement knew "what happened" and added, "This is America. We found bin Laden."

In 2002, the Los Angeles Times published a two-part story by Chuck Philips, titled "Who Killed Tupac Shakur?" based on a year-long investigation. Philips reported that "the shooting was carried out by a Compton gang called the Southside Crips to avenge the beating of one of its members by Shakur a few hours earlier. Orlando Anderson, the Crip whom Shakur had attacked, fired the fatal shots. Las Vegas police considered Anderson as a suspect and interviewed him only once, briefly. Anderson was killed nearly two years later in an unrelated gang shooting." Philips's article also implicated East Coast rappers, including The Notorious B.I.G., Tupac's rival at the time, and several New York City criminals.

The second article in Philips' series assessed the murder investigation and said that Las Vegas police had mismanaged the probe. His article stated that missteps of Las Vegas police: were (1) discounting the fight that occurred just hours before the shooting, in which Shakur was involved in beating Anderson in the MGM Grand lobby; (2) failing to follow up with a member of Shakur's entourage who witnessed the shooting, who told Las Vegas police he could probably identify one or more of the assailants, but was killed before being interviewed; and (3) failing to follow up a lead from a witness who spotted a white Cadillac similar to the car from which the fatal shots were fired and in which the shooters escaped.

Haaretz, an Israeli newspaper, reported in 2011 that the FBI released documents, as a result of a Freedom of Information Act request, revealing its investigation of the Jewish Defense League for extorting protection money from Shakur and other rappers after making death threats against them. In 2017, Knight claimed he might have been the target of the attack that killed Shakur, arguing that it was a hit on him as a staged coup to seize control of Death Row Records.

Witnesses 
At the time of the shooting, an entourage of around ten automobiles were following Knight and Shakur's vehicle. The
year following the shooting, Knight stated during an ABC Primetime Live interview that he did not know who had shot Shakur but would never tell officers if he did.

Kadafi was involved in a scuffle with officers two days following the shooting, after they pulled over a motorist he was acquainted with and he protested. Kadafi left Las Vegas days after Shakur's death, traveling to Atlanta and Los Angeles before settling in New Jersey, where his relatives lived. In that time, Compton investigators assembled mug shots of several gang members, which included Anderson, and hand delivered them to Las Vegas. Manning said detectives called Kadafi's lawyer to set up a meeting with the rapper so that he could be shown the pictures. According to Manning, the calls were not returned. Officers did not try to locate Kadafi, who was fatally shot in a housing project in Irvington, New Jersey, in November 1996, two months after Shakur's shooting.

Mean and Alexander told the Times in early 1997 that they had never been asked by Las Vegas police to view photos of possible suspects in the case, despite having observed the shooting and having seen the men in the car from which the shots were fired. In an interview with Alexander conducted by Las Vegas police on March 19, 1997, he was shown a series of eight photo lineups, but was unable to identify any suspects from them. Mean claimed to have seen all four men in the vehicle, while Alexander reported seeing the face of the suspect who shot Shakur. In his March 1997 police interview, Alexander said that he only saw the occupants of the shooter's car in "more of a profile." Las Vegas police disputed the pair's account of what they had reported to the officers the night of the shooting.

In the USA Network documentary Unsolved, broadcast in 2018, Duane "Keefe D" Davis, a Crips gang leader in California and Anderson's uncle, claimed to have been in the car, specifically in the front passenger seat, with Tupac's murderer when the shots were fired. He declined to name the shooter, citing "street code". Despite this, he stated that the car was driven by Terrence "T-Brown" Brown and that Anderson and DeAndre "Dre" Smith were sitting in the backseat of the car, all of whom were Southside Crips and are now deceased. He also stated that the shooter was sitting in the backseat. In 2016, a M.O.B. Piru and former Death Row bodyguard named James "Mob James" McDonald claimed he saw Anderson and other Southside Crips pull up at Club 662 in a white Cadillac and were briefly parked in the lot prior to the shooting of Suge’s BMW.

Allegations involving the Notorious B.I.G.
After rapper Christopher Wallace, better known as the Notorious B.I.G., was shot six months later, there was widespread speculation that the two murders were connected. Though initial reports claimed no evidence for the connection, Philips' 2002 report alleged that Wallace promised the Southside Crips $1 million to murder Shakur and supplied the gun used. According to Philips, the Crips began planning the murder after seeing Anderson's wounds and, already having connections to Wallace and being aware of his rivalry with Shakur, asked him for additional incentive. Philips claimed that Wallace supplied the weapon because he "wanted the satisfaction of knowing the fatal bullet came from his gun." Wallace denied playing a role in the murder, and his family produced computerized invoices suggesting that Wallace was recording a song in a New York City recording studio the night Shakur was shot. Wallace's manager, Wayne Barrow, and rapper Lil' Cease publicly denied that Wallace had a role in the crime and said they were with him in the studio the night of the shooting.

See also
 List of murdered hip hop musicians
 List of unsolved deaths

Notes

References

Tupac Shakur
1996 in music
1996 in Nevada
1996 murders in the United States
Deaths by firearm in Nevada
Deaths by person in Nevada
Drive-by shootings
History of Las Vegas
Unsolved murders in the United States
20th century in Las Vegas
Crimes in Nevada
September 1996 events in the United States